Adam David Tillcock (born 13 October 1993) is an English cricketer who has played for Nottinghamshire County Cricket Club. He made his first-class debut on 28 March 2017 for Loughborough MCCU against Leicestershire as part of the Marylebone Cricket Club University fixtures.

References

External links
 

1993 births
Living people
English cricketers
Nottinghamshire cricketers
Loughborough MCCU cricketers
Lincolnshire cricketers